The Peacock Clock is a large automaton featuring three life-sized mechanical birds. It was manufactured by the entrepreneur James Cox in the 2nd half of the 18th century and through the influence of Grigory Potemkin it was acquired by Catherine the Great in 1781. Today it is a prominent exhibit in the collections of the Hermitage Museum in Saint Petersburg. The clock is also shown daily on the Russian TV channel Russia-K.

References
Yuna Zek, Antonina Balina, Mikhail Guryev, Yuri Semionov: The Peacock Clock – photos, history and description of the Peacock Clock at hermitagemuseum.org (website of the Hermitage Museum, archived version)

Peacock Clock
18th-century robots
Collection of the Hermitage Museum
Automata (mechanical)